Azhagiya Thamizh Magal (  'Beautiful Tamil daughter') is a 2016 Singaporean Tamil-language soap opera, starring Vikneswary Se, Bharathi, Narain, Leena, Shamini Gunasagar, Mahalakshmi and among others. It aired on MediaCorp Vasantham every Monday to Thursday at 22:00 starting 26 September 2016 and 9 December 2016.

Cast
 Vikneswary Se as Gowthami (Actress)
 Bharathi as Radhika Prabhu
 Narain as Prabhu
 Vimala Velu as Amala Murali
 Vighnesh Wadarajan as Murali
 Leena as Poornima Rajesh 
 Punithan as Rajesh 
Duraishiva as Girish Rajesh Teacher
 Grijisha as Deepika Rajesh 
 Prakash as Girish Rajesh 
 Shamini Gunasagar as Revathy
 Varman Chandramohan as Santhosh
 Shafinah Banu as Deepika's teacher
 Mahalakshmi as Sunthari
 Jamuna Rani as Prabhu's mother
 Jabu Deen Faruk as Mahen
 Malathy Madavan

Original soundtrack
Background Score and Song were composed by Vicknesh Saravanan.

Soundtrack (OST)

Broadcast
Series was released on 26 September 2016 on Mediacorp Vasantham. It airs in [Singapore] on Mediacorp Vasantham, Its full length episodes and released its episodes on their app Toggle, a live TV feature was introduced on Toggle with English Subtitle.

References

External links 
 Vasantham Official Website
 Vasantham Facebook
 Azhagiya Thamizh Magal Episodes

Vasantham TV original programming
Tamil-language television shows in Singapore
Tamil-language romance television series
Singapore Tamil dramas
2016 Tamil-language television series debuts
2016 Tamil-language television series endings